The politics of the People's Republic of China takes place in a framework of a socialist republic run by a single party, the Chinese Communist Party (CCP), headed by a general secretary who tends to be the paramount leader of China. China is among few contemporary party-led dictatorships to not hold any direct elections at the national level. State power within the People's Republic of China (PRC) is exercised through the CCP, the State Council, and its provincial and local representation. The state uses , secret documents produced by Xinhua News Agency as a form of internal intelligence sharing to keep high-level CCP cadres informed of developments within the country. China's two special administrative regions (SARs), Hong Kong and Macau, have multi-party systems separate from the mainland's one-party system.

Aside from the SARs, the PRC consists of 22 provinces (excluding Taiwan Province and ROC-controlled Fujian), four directly administered municipalities (Beijing, Shanghai, Tianjin, and Chongqing), and five autonomous regions (Guangxi, Tibet, Xinjiang, Ningxia, and Inner Mongolia).

The Chinese political system is authoritarian. There are no freely elected national leaders, political opposition is suppressed, all religious activity is controlled by the CCP, dissent is not permitted and civil rights are curtailed. Elections in China occur under a single-party authoritarian political system. Elections occur only at the local level, not the national level.  The competitive nature of the elections is highly constrained by the CCP's monopoly on power in China, censorship, and government interference with the elections. According to Rory Truex, "the CCP tightly controls the nomination and election processes at every level in the people's congress system... the tiered, indirect electoral mechanism in the People's Congress system ensures that deputies at the highest levels face no semblance of electoral accountability to the Chinese citizenry."

Overview
Since the founding of the People's Republic of China in 1949, the government in Beijing officially asserts to be the sole legitimate government of all of China, which it defines as including mainland China and Taiwan. This has been disputed by the Republic of China (ROC) government since the Kuomintang (KMT) fled to Taipei in 1949. The Republic of China has since undergone significant political reforms.

Each local Bureau or office is under the coequal authority of the local leader and the leader of the corresponding office, bureau or ministry at the next higher level. People's Congress members at the county level are elected by voters. These county-level People's Congresses have the responsibility of oversight of local government and elect members to the Provincial (or Municipal in the case of independent municipalities) People's Congress. The Provincial People's Congress, in turn, elects members to the National People's Congress that meets each year in March in Beijing. The ruling CCP committee at each level plays a large role in the selection of appropriate candidates for election to the local congress and to the higher levels.

The President of China is the head of state, serving as the ceremonial figurehead under the National People's Congress. The Premier of China is the head of government, presiding over the State Council composed of four vice premiers and the heads of ministries and commissions. As a one-party state, the General Secretary of the Chinese Communist Party holds ultimate power and authority over state and government. The offices of President, General Secretary, and Chairman of the Central Military Commission have been held simultaneously by one individual since 1993, granting the individual de jure and de facto power over the country.

China's population, geographical vastness, and social diversity frustrate attempts to rule from Beijing. Economic reform during the 1980s and the devolution of much central government decision making, combined with the strong interest of local Communist Party officials in enriching themselves, has made it increasingly difficult for the central government to assert its authority. Political power has become much less personal and more institutionally based than it was during the first forty years of the PRC. For example, Deng Xiaoping was never the CCP General Secretary, President, or Premier of China, but was the leader of China for a decade. Currently, the authority of China's leaders is much more tied to their institutional base. The position of CCP General Secretary is the highest authority leading China's National People's Congress, State Council, Political Consultative Conference, Supreme People's Court and Supreme People's Procuratorate in Xi Jinping's administration.

The incident of Hong Kong's Missing Booksellers had alarmed the public that political confrontation of different political cadre in the senior level of the Chinese Communist Party still dominates China's politics.

Central government leaders must, in practice, build consensus for new policies among party members, local and regional leaders, influential non-party members, and the population at large. However, control is often maintained over the larger group through control of information. The Chinese Communist Party considers China to be in the initial stages of socialism. China's vast social, cultural and economic diversity has led to heterogeneity in the policies applied at the local and regional level.

The social, cultural, and political as well as economic consequences of market reform have created tensions in Chinese society. Zhou Tianyong, the vice director of research of the Central Party School of the Chinese Communist Party , argued,  that gradual political reform, as well as repression of those pushing for overly rapid change over the next twenty years, will be essential if China is to avoid an overly turbulent transition to a middle class dominated polity.

Self-description
The CCP calls its system of government a "socialist consultative democracy". According to the CCP theoretical journal Qiushi, "Consultative democracy was created by the CPC and the Chinese people as a form of socialist democracy. ... Not only representing a commitment to socialism, it carries forward China's political and cultural traditions. Not only representing a commitment to the organizational principles and leadership mode of democratic centralism, it also affirms the role of the general public in a democracy. Not only representing a commitment to the leadership of the CPC, it also gives play to the role of all political parties and organizations as well as people of all ethnic groups and all sectors of society".

The semi-official journal China Today stated the CCP's view: "Consultative democracy guarantees widespread and effective participation in politics through consultations carried out by political parties, peoples congresses, government departments, CPPCC committees, peoples organizations, communities, and social organizations".
In 2012, Li Changjian, a member of the National Committee of the Chinese People's Political Consultative Conference (CPPCC), China's top political advisory body, added that consultative democracy should be made a greater priority in China's political reform. 

A significant feature of socialist consultative democracy is consulting with different sectors in order to achieve maximum consensus, but elections also play a role. The political philosopher Daniel A. Bell believes that the People's Republic of China is often erroneously criticised for not having elections. Others in China reply that this is an error that likely stems from a misunderstanding of the PRC's election system.

Communist Party

The Chinese Communist Party (CCP) continues to dominate the Chinese political landscape. In periods of relative liberalization, the influence of people and groups outside the formal party structure has tended to increase, particularly in the economic realm. Under the command economy, every state-owned enterprise is required to have a party committee. 

Nevertheless, in all governmental institutions in the PRC, the party committees at all levels maintain a powerful and pivotal role in the administration. According to scholar Rush Doshi, "[t]he Party sits above the state, runs parallel to the state, and is enmeshed in every level of the state." Central party control is tightest in central government offices and in urban economic, industrial, and cultural settings; it is considerably looser over the government and party establishments in rural areas, where the majority of Mainland Chinese people live. The CCP's most important responsibility comes in the selection and promotion of personnel. They also see that party and state policy guidance is followed and that non-party members do not create autonomous organizations that could challenge party rule. Particularly important are the leading small groups which coordinate activities of different agencies. There is no convention that government committees contain at least one non-party member; party membership is a definite aid in the promotion and in being included in crucial policy-setting meetings.

Constitutionally, the party's highest body is the Party Congress, which is supposed to meet at least once every five years. Meetings were irregular before the Cultural Revolution but have been periodic since then. The CCP elects the Central Committee and the primary organs of power are formally parts of the central committee.

The primary organs of power in the CCP include:

The General Secretary, which is the highest-ranking official within the Party and usually the Chinese Paramount leader.
The Politburo, consisting of 22 full members (including the members of the Politburo Standing Committee);
The Politburo Standing Committee, the most powerful decision-making body in China, which as of June 2020 consists of seven members;
The Secretariat, the principal administrative mechanism of the CCP, headed by the General Secretary;
The Central Military Commission;
The Central Discipline Inspection Commission, which is charged with rooting out corruption and malfeasance among party cadres.

Intra-party factions 
Chinese politics have long been defined by the competition between intra-party factions' ability to place key members and allies in positions of power within the CCP and Chinese government.

Under general secretaries Jiang Zemin and Hu Jintao, the two main factions were thought to be the Tuanpai and the Shanghai Clique. The Tuanpai were thought to be cadres and officials that originated from the Communist Youth League of China, while the Shanghai Clique were thought to be officials that rose to prominence under Jiang Zemin when he was first mayor, and then Communist Party secretary, of Shanghai.

Xi Jinping, who became general secretary in 2012, has significantly centralized power, removing the influence of the old factions and promoting his own allies, sometimes called the "Xi Jinping faction". Due to this, the old factions including the Tuanpai are considered to be extinct, especially since the 20th CCP National Congress, in which Xi's allies dominated the new Politburo and the Politburo Standing Committee.

Government

The primary organs of state power are the National People's Congress (NPC), the President, and the State Council. Members of the State Council include the Premier, a variable number of vice premiers (now four), five state councillors (protocol equal of vice premiers but with narrower portfolios), and 29 ministers and heads of State Council commissions. During the 1980s there was an attempt made to separate party and state functions, with the party deciding general policy and the state carrying it out. The attempt was abandoned in the 1990s with the result that the political leadership within the state are also the leaders of the party, thereby creating a single centralized locus of power.

Under the Constitution of China, the NPC is the highest organ of state power in China. It meets annually for about 2 weeks to review and approve major new policy directions, laws, the budget, and major personnel changes. Most national legislation in China is adopted by the Standing Committee of the National People's Congress (NPCSC). Most initiatives are presented to the NPCSC for consideration by the State Council after previous endorsement by the Communist Party's Politburo Standing Committee. Although the NPC generally approves State Council policy and personnel recommendations, the NPC and its standing committee has increasingly asserted its role as the national legislature and has been able to force revisions in some laws.

According to Daniel A. Bell, the political system in China represents a 'political meritocracy' that whilst had room for improvement, can help "remedy the key flaws of electoral democracy" and ensure only experienced and competent candidates can lead the country.

Removal of term limits

In March 2018, China's party-controlled National People's Congress passed a set of constitutional amendments including removal of term limits for the president and vice president, the creation of a National Supervisory Commission, as well as enhancing the central role of the CCP. On 17 March 2018, the Chinese legislature reappointed Xi as president, now without term limits; Wang Qishan was appointed vice president.

According to the Financial Times, Xi expressed his views of constitutional amendment at meetings with Chinese officials and foreign dignitaries. Xi explained the decision in terms of needing to align two more powerful posts—General Secretary of the Chinese Communist Party and Chairman of the Central Military Commission (CMC)—which have no term limits. However, Xi did not say whether he intended to serve as CCP general secretary, CMC chairman and state president, for three or more terms.

Elections 

No substantial legal political opposition groups exist, and the country is run by the Chinese Communist Party (CCP). There are other political parties in the PRC under the CCP's United Front system, which participate in the People's Political Consultative Conference but serve to endorse CCP policies. Even as there have been some moves in the direction of democratisation as far as the electoral system at least, in that openly contested People's Congress elections are now held at the village and town levels, and that legislatures have shown some assertiveness from time to time, the party retains effective control over governmental appointments. This is because the CCP wins by default in most electorates.

The eight registered minor parties have existed since before 1950. These parties all formally accept the leadership of the CCP and their activities are directed by the United Front Work Department (UFWD) of the CCP. Their original function was to create the impression that the PRC was being ruled by a diverse national front, not a one-party dictatorship. The major role of these parties is to attract and subsequently muzzle niches in society that have political tendencies, such as academia. Although these parties are tightly controlled and do not challenge the CCP, members of the parties often individually are found in policy-making national institutions, and there is a convention that state institutions generally have at least one sinecure from a minor political party.

The minor parties include the Revolutionary Committee of the Chinese Kuomintang, founded in 1948 by leftist dissident members of the mainstream Kuomintang then under control of Generalissimo Chiang Kai-shek; China Democratic League, created in 1941 as an umbrella coalition group during its conflict with Japan for intellectuals in education and the arts; China Democratic National Construction Association, formed in 1945 by educators and national capitalists (industrialists and business people); China Association for Promoting Democracy, started in 1945 by intellectuals in cultural, education (primary and secondary schools), and publishing circles; Chinese Peasants' and Workers' Democratic Party, originated in 1930 by intellectuals in medicine, the arts, and education; China Party for Public Interest (China Zhi Gong Dang), founded in 1925 to attract the support of overseas Chinese; Jiusan Society, founded in 1945 by a group of college professors and scientists to commemorate the victory of the "international war against fascism" on 3 September; and Taiwan Democratic Self-Government League, created in 1947 by "patriotic supporters of democracy who originated in Taiwan and now reside on the mainland."

Coordination between the eight registered minor parties and the CCP is done through the Chinese People's Political Consultative Conference which meets annually in Beijing in March at about the same time that the National People's Congress meets. In addition, there are a few minor parties which either lack official recognition or are actively suppressed by the government, such as the Maoist Communist Party of China, China Democracy Party and China New Democracy Party, which have their headquarters outside of the Mainland China.

Administrative divisions

National armed forces 

The Chinese Communist Party created and leads the People's Liberation Army. After the PRC was established in 1949, the PLA also became a state military. The state military system inherited and upholds the principle of the Communist Party's absolute leadership over the people's armed forces. The Party and the State jointly established the Central Military Commission that carries out the task of supreme military leadership over the armed forces.

The 1954 PRC Constitution provides that the State Chairman (President) directs the armed forces and made the State Chairman the chair of the Defense Commission (the Defense Commission is an advisory body, it does not lead the armed forces). On 28 September 1954, the Central Committee of the Chinese Communist Party re-established the Central Military Commission as the leader of the PLA and the people's armed forces. From that time onwards, the system of joint Party and state military leadership was established. The Central Committee of the Communist Party leads in all military affairs. The State Chairman directs the state military forces and the development of the military forces managed by the State Council.

In December 2004, the fifth National People’s Congress revised the State Constitution to provide that the State Central Military Commission leads all the armed forces of the state.  The chair of the State CMC is chosen and removed by the full NPC while the other members are chosen by the NPC Standing Committee.  However, the CMC of the Central Committee of the Chinese Communist Party remained the Party organization that directly leads the military and all the other armed forces. In actual practice, the Party CMC, after consultation with the democratic parties, proposes the names of the State CMC members of the NPC so that these people after going through the legal processes can be elected by the NPC to the State Central Military Commission. That is to say, that the CMC of the CCP Central Committee and the CMC of the State are one group and one organization, even though organizationally these two CMCs are subordinate to two different systems. Therefore, the armed forces are under the absolute leadership of the CCP and are also the armed forces of the state. This system, in principle, ensures the joint leadership of the CCP and the state over the armed forces.

State leaders

Politburo Standing Committee

Full Politburo members

Legal system

Nationality and ethnicity law 

Nationality is granted at birth to children with at least one Chinese-national parent, with some exceptions. In general, naturalization or the obtainment of the People's Republic of China nationality is difficult. The Nationality Law prescribes only three conditions for the obtainment of PRC nationality (marriage to a PRC national is one, permanent residence is another). PRC nationals who acquire a foreign nationality automatically lose Chinese nationality. State functionaries and military personnel on active service are not permitted renounce their Chinese nationality. If a citizen wishes to resume PRC nationality, foreign nationality is no longer recognized.

The PRC is officially a multi-ethnic state providing ethnic autonomy in the form of autonomous administrative entities. By law, ethnic minorities receive advantages in areas such as population control, school admissions, government employment, and military recruitment. The PRC recognizes 56 nationalities in China and simultaneously categorizes them as one hegemonic Chinese nation. However, separatist sentiment has occasionally flared in Tibet and Xinjiang. As such, independence groups and foreign human rights groups are critical of the PRC's policies in ethnic areas and have bemoaned the presence of Han Chinese (the main ethnic group of China) in Xinjiang and Tibet.

Policies toward Uyghurs 

In 2020, widespread public reporting detailed the Chinese government's pattern of human rights violations in its continuing maltreatment of Uyghurs. These abuses include forced labor, arbitrary detainment, forced political indoctrination, destruction of cultural heritage, and forced abortions and sterilization. Critics of the policy have described it as the sinicization of Xinjiang and called it an ethnocide or cultural genocide, with many activists, NGOs, human rights experts, government officials, and the U.S. government calling it a genocide. The Chinese government denies it is committing human rights violations in Xinjiang.

Foreign relations

The PRC maintains diplomatic relations with most countries in the world. In 1971, the PRC replaced the Republic of China, commonly known as "Taiwan" since the 1970s, as the sole representative of China in the United Nations and as one of the five permanent members of the United Nations Security Council. China had been represented by the Republic of China at the time of the UN's founding in 1945. (See also China and the United Nations.)

Under the One-China policy, the PRC has made it a precondition to establishing diplomatic relations that the other country acknowledges its claim to all of China, including Taiwan, and severs any official ties with the Republic of China (ROC) government. The government actively opposes foreign government meetings with the 14th Dalai Lama in a political capacity, as the spokesperson for a separatist movement in Tibet.

The PRC has been playing a leading role in calling for free trade areas and security pacts amongst its Asia-Pacific neighbours. In 2004, the PRC proposed an entirely new East Asia Summit (EAS) framework as a forum for regional security issues that pointedly excluded the United States. The EAS, which includes ASEAN Plus Three, India, Australia and New Zealand, held its inaugural summit in 2005. China is also a founder and member of the Shanghai Cooperation Organisation (SCO), alongside Russia and the Central Asian republics.

Much of the current foreign policy is based on the concept of "China's peaceful development". Nonetheless, crises in relations with foreign countries have occurred at various times in its recent history, particularly with the United States; e.g., the U.S. bombing of the Chinese embassy in Belgrade during the Kosovo conflict in May 1999 and the Hainan Island incident in April 2001. China's foreign relations with many Western nations suffered for a time following the 1989 Tiananmen Square protests and massacre. A much troubled foreign relationship is that between China and Japan, which has been strained at times by Japan's refusal to acknowledge its wartime past to the satisfaction of the PRC, such as revisionistic comments made by prominent Japanese officials, and insufficient details given to the Nanjing Massacre and other atrocities committed during World War II in Japanese history textbooks. Another point of conflict between the two countries is the frequent visits by Japanese government officials to the Yasukuni Shrine, which honours not only Japanese World War II dead but also many convicted World War II war criminals, including 14 Class A convictions.

Foreign aid 

After the establishment of the People's Republic of China under the CCP in 1949, China joined the international community in providing foreign aid. In the past few decades, the international community has seen an increase in Chinese foreign aid. Specifically, a recent example is the Belt and Road Initiative (BRI).

The Belt and Road Initiative (BRI) is an infrastructure project that was launched in 2013 by Chinese leader Xi Jinping. The goal of the program is to expand maritime routes and land infrastructure networks connecting China with Asia, Africa, and Europe, boosting trade and economic growth. As the program claims, the five main targets are "policy coordination, facilitating connectivity, unimpeded trade, financial integration and establishing new bonds between people". More specifically, it involves a massive development of trade routes that will create a large expansion of land transportation infrastructure and new ports in the Pacific and Indian oceans to facilitate regional and intercontinental trade flow and increase oil and gas supply.

BRI is also a controversial policy in the development industry. On the one hand, some believe the economic benefits from BRI will be extraordinary. For instance, several independent World Bank analyses and reports have demonstrated that the BRI would be largely beneficial. The Belt and Road Initiative: Economic, Poverty and Environmental Impacts working paper found that the BRI will increase global income by 0.7% by 2030, which is almost half a trillion dollars. The study also found that the program will "..lifting 7.6 million people from extreme poverty and 32 million from moderate poverty". Similarly, another study that examined the 71 countries potentially involved in the BRI highlights that the program increases trade flow by up to 4.1%; and with international cooperations, an increase in trade flow will be three times more on average. In terms of economic growth measure by GDP, a quantitative trade model study, The Growth and Welfare Effects of the Belt and Road Initiative on East Asia Pacific Countries, indicates that the BRI will increase GDP between 2.6% and 3.9% for East Asia Pacific developing countries, "which is higher than the expected gains for the world as a whole". Lastly, according to another study that examined the completed and planned BRI projects on trade efficiency, BRI economies' shipment and trade costs will decrease by 1.5% and 2.8%; for the world, costs will decrease by 1.1% and 2.2%; for countries located most closely to the corridors where the projects are built, shipments and trade costs will decrease by 11.9% and 10.2%.

On the other hand, BRI has also gotten immense economic and political criticisms due to the belief that the projects is a way for China to gain socioeconomic and geopolitical influence. For instance, BRI will lead to border openings with Central Asia, which in turn bring economic development to the west of China. Not only will China benefit from economic development in the west, but the BRI also could serve as a long-term strategy for political stability by the Chinese government. The Western region of China Xinjiang Province, "...where separatist violence has been on the upswing...", is a crucial security region. Through securing economic stability and growth, the government could also further control the western region of China. In 2019, protests against Chinese factories construction work swept through Kazakhstan due to the concern over the Chinese government's treatment of Uighurs in the Western region of China. In addition, many countries have publicly criticized the BRI projects. For example, India has strongly opposed some of the BRI's projects because they feel threatened by the activities in Pakistan. New Delhi feels BRI could lead to the possibility that the geopolitical influence "...will undermine the Indian claims in the contested Kashmir region". Indian government sees the Chinese expansion in the region as a de facto hostile act that must be controlled. Lastly, critics of BRI has also suggested that the projects may be creating a debt trap. For example, China is Tajikistan’s single largest creditor, in which from 2007 to 2016, debt to China accounts for almost 80% of Tajikistan's total increase in international debt. Specifically, China and Tajikistan have had a long-term territorial dispute, which in 2012, "Tajikistan handed over approximately 1000 square kilometers of land to China in exchange for certain economic benefits".

International disputes
The PRC is in a number of international territorial disputes, several of which involved the Sino-Russian border. Although the great majority of them are now resolved, China's territorial disputes have led to several localized wars in the last 50 years, including the Sino-Indian War in 1962, the Sino-Soviet border conflict in 1969 and the Sino-Vietnam War in 1979. In 2001, China and Russia signed the Treaty of Good-Neighborliness and Friendly Cooperation, which ended the conflict. Other territorial disputes include islands in the East and South China Seas, and undefined or disputed borders with India, Bhutan and North Korea.

Territorial disputes

The following territories are claimed by both China and one or more other countries:
Socotra Rock (with South Korea)
Diaoyu Islands (with Japan)
Spratly Islands (with Vietnam, Brunei, Malaysia, the Philippines)
Paracel Islands (with Vietnam)
Panatag Shoal (with the Philippines)
South Tibet – parts of Arunachal Pradesh and Assam (with India)
Aksai Chin – (with India)

International organizations
Since the establishment of the People's Republic of China under the Chinese Communist Party in 1949, China has a long history of participation with international organizations. China officially entered the global community on 26 October 1971, when the UN General Assembly adopted Resolution 2758 to transfer the seat from the Republic of China (ROC) on Taiwan to the People's Republic of China (PRC). The period prior to 1990, China experienced tremendous instability, such as the Cultural Revolution; however, after Deng Xiaoping's economic reform, China's economy rapidly developed which allowed China to emerge as a country now that is highly influential in the international arena.

United Nations 

Today, not only is China a part of many UN organizations, it is also one of the five permanent members of the UN Security Council. A memo done by the U.S.-China Economic and Security Review Commission identified Chinese nationals serving in leadership position within international organizations signifies China's increasing involvement in the international arena. For instance, the International Telecommunication Union (ITU), International Civil Aviation Organization (ICAO), United Nations Industrial Development Organization (UNIDO), Food and Agriculture Organization (FAO), and so on are all organizations that Chinese nationals are currently in position of (The memo is updated on a semi-annual basis).

List of International Organizations: AfDB, APEC, AsDB, BIS, CDB (non-regional), ESCAP, FAO, G-77, IAEA, IBRD, ICAO, ICC, ICRM, IDA, IFAD, IFC, IFRCS, IHO, ILO, IMF, International Maritime Organization, Inmarsat, Intelsat, Interpol, IOC, ISO, ITU, ITUC, LAIA (observer), MINURSO, NAM (observer), OPCW, PCA, SCO, United Nations, UN Security Council, UNAMSIL, UNCTAD, UNESCO, UNHCR, UNIDO, UNIKOM, UNITAR, UNTSO, UNU, UPU, WCO, WHO, WIPO, WMO, WToO, WTrO, Zangger Committee

Foreign media

Non-governmental organizations (NGOs) 

Although NGO development in China is relatively slow compared to other countries, a Harvard University academic study reveals that China had NGOs as early as during the Dynasties. Specifically in the forms of American missionaries, which assisted in rural reconstruction programs and ideological reforms locally. After the establishment of The People's Republic of China (PRC) in 1949, Mao banned any NGOs that were related to counter revolutionary goals. During the reform era under Deng beginning the 1970s, NGOs although not completely banned, three laws were implemented to keep relatively tight control over them––the Regulations on the Registration and Management of Social Organizations, the Regulations on the Registration and Management of Foundations, and the Interim Provisions for the Administration of Foreign Chambers of Commerce in China. The latter two were implemented after the 1989 Tiananmen Square protests and massacre, and the general tone of all the regulations emphasized government control. For instance, the regulations require a two-tiered management system, in which before being legally registered by the Ministry of Civil Affairs, a government agency must sponsor the organization; thus, two governmental agencies must be monitoring the day-to-day operations of the NGO. However, in the 1990s, NGOs began to regain momentum despite restrictions in place. Today, the number of registered organizations in China has grown to over 700,000, "... including many professional and friendship associations, foundations working in the fields of education, science, and culture, and a large number of nonprofits engaged in poverty alleviation, social work with people with disabilities, children, and the elderly. The number of nonprofits and environmental education and climate action groups has also significantly grown".

A case study done by Jonathan Schwartz on "Environmental NGOs in China: Roles and Limits" examines the debate of the nature of state-civil society relations in authoritarian regimes through looking at environmental NGOs in China, in which two views are presented: 1. the relationship between NGOs and the state is zero-sum, in which the state comes out winning through control, and 2. the relationships between NGOs and the state is positive sum, in which both sides benefit from cooperation to achieve shared goals. By evaluating environmental NGOs’ influence, impact, and potential in China, Schwartz argues that "...the Chinese central government is caught between the goal of environmental protection and continued control over the activities of potentially independent organizations".

Today, NGOs such as Give2Asia, the Asia Foundation, the Gates Foundation, and so on conduct work everywhere in China ranging from education to poverty alleviation. In 2017 a new policy, "Management of Overseas NGOs’ Activities in Mainland China Law" (FNGO Law), was enacted, which creates registration barriers that, for instance, require a Chinese partner organization to sign on. The reaction from the West has widely been that the space for NGOs to conduct work in may be shrinking.

Many NGOs in the PRC have been described as government-organized non-governmental organization (GONGOs) that are organized under the CCP's United Front system.

Civil society 
Academic debates on whether China has a "civil society" is ongoing. The majority of research on Chinese civil society for the past two decades has been to examine "the organizational independence of civic associations from the state". More recently, researchers have argued that the western driven definition of "civil society" is too narrowly fixed, which does not allow for a full understanding of Chinese civil society. Taru Salmenkari, an associate professor specializing in contemporary China and issues of democracy and civil society in East Asia at Tallinn University, has argued in her "Theoretical Poverty in the Research on Chinese Civil Society" that to understand Chinese civil society, one must "...go beyond the question of the degree of autonomy from the state. It must address the nature of horizontal contacts through which civil society is constituted".

Protests 

The authoritarian government in China suppresses protests that challenge the authority of the government while showing greater tolerance for protests that are rooted in localized economic or social unrest. Under Xi Jinping's rule, the government has resorted to greater suppression.

Advocacy 
Chinese civil society has always had to "deal" with restricted spaces for advocacy. For instance, a study by Harvard University on "How Censorship in China Allows Government Criticism but Silences Collective Expression" demonstrates that while the censorship of information exists, the purpose of the censorship is not to silence all comments made about the state or any particular issues, but rather to prevent and reduce the probability of collective actions. As the study illustrates, allowing social media to flourish also has allowed negative and positive comments about the state and its leaders to exist. Civil society advocacy is relatively possible as long as it does not lead to collective action. Specifically, the development of technology and the internet has also allowed civil society advocacy to flourish.

See also
Politics of Hong Kong
Politics of Macau
Censorship in China
Chinese Socialist Democracy
People's organization
List of national leaders of the People's Republic of China

Notes

References 

 

pt:República Popular da China#Política